Ruvindu Gunasekera (born 20 July 1991) is a Sri Lankan-born cricketer who played One Day International cricket for Canada.

Early life
Gunasekara was born in Colombo, Sri Lanka, where he began playing cricket at an early age, under the influence of his father, who was a player on the Sri Lanka A cricket team. Gunasekara immigrated to Toronto, Canada in 2006. He enrolled at the University of Toronto Scarborough in 2010, pursuing a degree in management.

Career

Sri Lanka
Gunasekera was a member of the team for ICC Under 19 World Cup in New Zealand.

In March 2018, he was the leading run-scorer in the 2017–18 SLC Twenty20 Tournament in Sri Lanka, with 272 runs in five matches, batting for Saracens Sports Club. The following month, he was also named in Dambulla's squad for the 2018 Super Provincial One Day Tournament.

In August 2018, he was named in Dambulla's squad the 2018 SLC T20 League. In February 2019, Sri Lanka Cricket named him as the Best Batsman in the 2017–18 SLC Twenty20 Tournament.

Canada
In January 2018, he was named in Canada's squad for the 2018 ICC World Cricket League Division Two tournament. On 3 June 2018, he was selected to play for the Vancouver Knights in the players' draft for the inaugural edition of the Global T20 Canada tournament. In April 2019, he was named in Canada's squad for the 2019 ICC World Cricket League Division Two tournament in Namibia.

In June 2021, he was selected to take part in the Minor League Cricket tournament in the United States following the players' draft.

References

External links 

1991 births
Living people
Canada One Day International cricketers
Canada Twenty20 International cricketers
Canadian cricketers
Cricketers at the 2011 Cricket World Cup
Canadian sportspeople of Sri Lankan descent
Sri Lankan emigrants to Canada
Sri Lankan cricketers
Badureliya Sports Club cricketers
Cricketers from Colombo
ICC Americas cricketers
Nuwara Eliya District cricketers
Saracens Sports Club cricketers